Tunnell is a surname, and may refer to:

 Byron M. Tunnell - Railroad Commission of Texas member and politician
 Ebe W. Tunnell - American merchant and politician
 Emlen Tunnell - African-American football player
 George Tunnell - American vocalist
 James M. Tunnell - American teacher, lawyer and politician
 James M. Tunnell, Jr. - American politician
 Jeff Tunnell - computer game producer, programmer and designer
 Jerrold B. Tunnell (1950–2022) - American mathematician
 Lee Tunnell - American pitcher
 Michael O. Tunnell (born 1950) - American writer, children's literature critic, and educator

See also
 Tunnel

The Tunnell family lived in England in the 18th century, and after the Mayflower, came to America.